The Lostine River is a  tributary of the Wallowa River in northeastern Oregon in the United States. It drains a portion of the Eagle Cap Wilderness of the Wallowa Mountains in the Wallowa–Whitman National Forest and joins the Wallowa River at Wallowa.

In 1988, the upper  of the Lostine River were listed as Wild and Scenic. A  segment in the wilderness below the river's source at Minam Lake were classified "wild". The next  were designated "recreational".

The river flows generally north following a glaciated U-shaped canyon.

Irrigation diversions, which play a significant role in the river, contributed to the extinction of the local run of Coho salmon in the 1960s and reduced the population of the run of spring Chinook salmon to a low of 13 fish in 1999. Both runs had been an historic source of food for the Nez Perce people. The Nez Perce began restoration efforts in the 1990s, and by 2005, the Chinook salmon run had risen to 800 fish. An agreement that year among farmers, the Nez Perce, and the Oregon Water Trust led to efforts to preserve the stream flow during summer, helping the salmon to survive.  By 2009, the run had increased to more than 2,000 Chinook salmon.

See also 
 List of rivers of Oregon
 List of National Wild and Scenic Rivers

References

External links 
 Grande Ronde Model Watershed
 Wild and Scenic Lostine River: U.S. Forest Service
 Photo of the river's valley by Dsdugan

Rivers of Oregon
Wild and Scenic Rivers of the United States
Rivers of Wallowa County, Oregon
Eagle Cap Wilderness